Mulualem Regassa (born 4 June 1984) is an Ethiopian footballer. He currently plays for Saint-George SA.

Regassa is a midfielder and is part of the Ethiopia national football team. He began his career with Saint-George SA and is currently the team captain ( no longer the captain – Degeu Debebe is the captain).

References
 

1984 births
Living people
Ethiopian footballers
Ethiopia international footballers
Association football midfielders